The following lists events that happened during 2001 in Ethiopia.

Incumbents
President: Negasso Gidada (until October 8), Girma Wolde-Giorgis (from October 8)
Prime Minister: Meles Zenawi

Events

January
 January 10 - Ethiopia rejects Djibouti's port-handling charges for imports and exports with them, claiming it to be a violation of an agreement in 1999.
 January 13 - Diplomatic tension rises with Somalia, who accuses Ethiopia of attempting to create a secessionist state in the already unstable country.
 January 25 - Somalia's Prime Minister accuses Ethiopia of destabilising his country by massing troops in the south west.

February
 February 20 - Thousands of Ethiopian troops begin withdrawing from Eritrea after a successful peace agreement after the Eritrean-Ethiopian War.
 February 24 - Ethiopia declares the withdrawal from Eritrea complete.

April
 April 12 - Police crack down on student protesters, demanding greater freedom of speech. This leaves 50 students hospitalised.
 April 17 - Hundreds of riot police storm in and beat up civilians during the riots including women and children in the capital of Addis Ababa.
 April 18 - Thousands of students clash with police during the second day of rioting.
 April 21 - The Ethiopian Human Rights Council denies that student protesters are being held in detention camps, causing anger among relatives of the missing students.
 April 24 - The University of Addis Ababa reopens after temporary closure during riots that left 39 killed and 250 injured.
 April 26 - More than 2000 students are released from prison by riot police. Several students report instances of torture while incarcerated.

May
 May 4 - The political temperature is reported to have risen since the April riots.

November
 November 15 - Animal smuggling is reported to have cost the country 100 million dollars every year.

References

 
Years of the 21st century in Ethiopia
2000s in Ethiopia
Ethiopia
Ethiopia